Uilkraal River is a river in the Western Cape province of South Africa. The river mouth is located at Gans Bay.

See also 
 List of rivers of South Africa
 List of drainage basins of South Africa
 Water Management Areas

References

Rivers of the Western Cape